20/20 is the 22nd studio album by George Benson, released on the Warner Bros. record label in 1985. The lead single by the same name reached #48 on the Billboard Hot 100. The album was certified Gold by the RIAA. "You Are the Love of My Life" is a duet with Roberta Flack; it was one of numerous songs used for Eden Capwell and Cruz Castillo on the American soap opera Santa Barbara.  Also included on 20/20 is the original version of the song "Nothing's Gonna Change My Love for You" which would later become a smash hit for Hawaiian singer Glenn Medeiros.

Songwriters on the album include: Clif Magness, Mark Mueller, Tom Keane, James Newton Howard, Steve Lukather, Cruz Sembello, Daniel Sembello, Jon Sembello, Michael Sembello, Michael Masser, Gerry Goffin, Charles Trenet, Jack Lawrence, Cecil Womack, Linda Womack, Randy Goodrum, Steve Kipner, Neil Larsen, and Linda Creed.

Track listing

Personnel 
 George Benson – lead vocals, guitar (2, 9), guitar solo (4-8), harmony vocals (8)
 Wells Christie – Synclavier programming
 Randy Waldman – keyboards (1), track arrangements (1), synthesizers (3), additional synthesizer (6)
 James Newton Howard – acoustic piano (2), synthesizers (2, 5), string arrangements (2)
 Clifford Carter – additional synthesizer (2, 8), drum programming  (2, 7), synthesizers (5), keyboards (7)
 Rob Mounsey – Synclavier (2, 6, 8, 9), vocoder (2), synthesizer bass (9)
 Richard Tee – Fender Rhodes (2), synthesizer bass (8, 9)
 Daniel Sembello – DX7 Rhodes (3), synthesizer bass (3), synthesizers (8), drum programming (8), ride cymbal (8)
 Robbie Buchanan – keyboards (4), synthesizer programming (4), arrangements (4)
 Joe Sample – acoustic piano (5)
 Randy Goodrum – synthesizer programming (6), Oberheim DMX (6), Oberheim DSX sequencer (6)
 Barnaby Finch – DX7 Rhodes (9)
 Dave Grusin – string synthesizer (9), flute (9)
 Neil Larsen – synthesizers (9)
 Randy Kerber – keyboards (10)
 Michael Sembello – guitar (1, 8), rhythm guitar (1, 8), guitar solo (1, 8), drum programming (3, 8), backing vocals (3, 8)
 Dann Huff – guitar (4)
 Paul Jackson, Jr. – guitar (4, 10)
 Freddie Green – rhythm guitar (5)
 Cecil Womack – guitar (7), backing vocals (7)
 David Williams – rhythm guitar (9)
 Marcus Miller – bass (2)
 Nathan East – bass (4)
 Earl May – bass (5)
 Anthony Jackson – bass (7)
 Neil Stubenhaus – bass (10)
 Clif Magness – drum programming (1), track arrangements (1)
 Russ Titelman – drum programming (1)
 Steve Ferrone – additional drums (1)
 Dave Weckl – additional drums (1), additional cymbals (6)
 Bryan Lee Janszen – Simmons drum programming (3, 8)
 Carlos Vega – drums (4)
 John Robinson – drums (5, 9)
 Steve Kipner – Oberheim DMX (6), Oberheim DSX sequencer (6)
 Rick Shlosser – drums (10)
 Paulinho da Costa – percussion (1, 3, 6, 9)
 Errol "Crusher" Bennett – finger cymbals (7)
 Ralph MacDonald – triangle (7), percussion (8)
 Gary Herbig – saxophones (1)
 Kim Hutchcroft – saxophones (1)
 Frank Wess – alto saxophone (5)
 Charles Williams – alto saxophone (5)
 Robert Eldridge – baritone saxophone (5)
 George Coleman – tenor saxophone (5)
 Jimmy Heath – tenor saxophone (5)
 Robin Eubanks – trombone (5)
 Slide Hampton – trombone (5)
 Benny Powell – trombone (5)
 Dave Taylor – trombone (5)
 Gary Grant – trumpet (1)
 Jerry Hey – trumpet (1), horn arrangements (1)
 Jon Faddis – trumpet (5)
 Earl Gardner – trumpet (5)
 Joe Newman – trumpet (5)
 Lew Soloff – trumpet (5)
 Felix Vega – trumpet (5)
 George Young – flute (7)
 Frank Foster – horn arrangements and conductor (5)
 Ralph Burns – string arrangements and conductor (5, 7)
 Michael Masser – rhythm track arrangements (10)
 Gene Page – rhythm track and string arrangements (10)
 Patti Austin – backing vocals (1, 6), additional backing vocals (3), harmony vocals (6)
 Gordon Grody – backing vocals (1)
 Lani Groves – backing vocals (1)
 Richard Marx – backing vocals (4)
 Deborah Thomas – backing vocals (4, 10)
 James Taylor – backing and harmony vocals (6)
 Linda Womack – backing vocals (7)
 Roberta Flack – lead vocals (10)
 David Cochrane – backing vocals (10)
 Darryl Phinnessee – backing vocals (10)

Production 
 Executive Producer – Russ Titelman
 Production Coordinator – Mary Melia
 Engineers – Jim Boyer, Lee Herschberg, Gary Ladinsky, Michael Mancini, Elliot Scheiner, Russell Schmitt and Thom Wilson.
 Additional Engineers – Dick Bogart, Kendal Brown, Dean Burt, John Convertino, Jim Gallagher, Josiah Gluck, Cliff Hodson, John Rollo and Nicholas Spigel.
 Assistant Engineers – Michael Abbott, Mike Allaire, Nelson Ayers, Mike Birnholz, Paul Brown, Ollie Cotton, Nick Delre, Paul Higgins, Steve Hirsch, Cliff Jones, Barbara Ivone, Leslie Klein, Robin Laine, Bruce Lampcov, James Nichols, Bobby Warner and Jay Willis.
 Mixing – Jim Boyer, Ed Rak, Elliot Scheiner and Russ Titelman.
 Mastered by Ted Jensen at Sterling Sound (New York, NY).
 Art Direction – Simon Levy
 Design – Kav DeLuxe
 Photography – Richard Bomersheim
 Styling – Bill Whitten 
 Management – Fritz & Turner Management

Charts

Weekly charts

Year-end charts

Certifications

References

George Benson albums
1985 albums
Albums produced by Russ Titelman
Albums produced by Michael Masser
Warner Records albums
Albums produced by Danny Sembello
Albums produced by Michael Sembello
Albums recorded at A&M Studios